The Marine and Coastal Research Institute "José Benito Vives de Andréis" (INVEMAR) is a nonprofit marine and coastal research institute of Colombia, linked to the Ministry of Environment and Sustainable Development. They edit the journal Boletín de Investigaciones Marinas y Costeras (the Bulletin of Marine and Coastal Research). It is located in Playa Salguero, in Santa Marta, and is named after José Benito Vives de Andréis, a well-known local politician involved different aspects of the city's development. Their institutional motto "Colombia 50% sea" refers to the extensive jurisdictional maritime area the country has.

INVEMAR is currently led by director general Francisco Armando Arias Isaza, a navy officer and marine biologist with a PhD in Coastal Zone Management.

Purpose and function 

The mission of INVEMAR is to carry out basic and applied research on the environment and renewable resources in marine and oceanic ecosystems of Colombia, to provide the scientific knowledge for the sustainable management of the resources, the recovery of the marine and protection of coastal ecosystems.

Among its objectives are to advise other governmental agencies on the use of natural resources and conservation of coastal and marine ecosystem, to liaise with the Ministry of Environment, and strengthen scientific and research capabilities in Colombia.

Research programs

Biodiversity and Marine Ecosystems 
This program is in charge of the inventory of the marine and coastal biodiversity of Colombia. It also manages the Museum of Marine Natural History of Colombia Makuriwa.

Marine Environmental Quality 
This program focuses on the impact of natural and anthropogenic activities on marine and coastal ecosystems.

Marine and Coastal Geoscience 
This program studies geographical and physicochemical aspects of coastal and oceanic systems, and how they are influenced by Colombia's productive processes.

Valuation and Use of Marine and Coastal Resources 

This program deals mainly with the sustainable use and production in coastal environments, and the application of related products in health and industry.

Public engagement and outreach 
INVEMAR manages Makuriwa, the Museum of Marine Natural History of Colombia; its name comes from the Ikun language of the Arhuaco indigenous populations. Their purpose is to share their research and knowledge about the Colombian coastal and oceanic ecosystems, to promote the rational use of resources by scientists, policy makers and the general public.

They also engage the public using social media, through their Twitter and Instagram accounts.

References

External links
INVEMAR on Twitter
INVEMAR on Instagram

Government agencies of Colombia
Ministry of Environment and Sustainable Development (Colombia)
Environment of Colombia
Government agencies established in 1993
Research institutes in Colombia
Oceanographic organizations
Santa Marta